The Flint Deanery is a Roman Catholic deanery in the Diocese of Wrexham that covers several churches in Flintshire, Wales.

The dean is centred at the Church of the Immaculate Conception in Flint.

Churches 
 Our Lady of the Rosary, Buckley
 The Blessed Sacrament, Connah's Quay
 The Blessed Trinity, Queensferry - served from Connah's Quay
 The Immaculate Conception, Flint
 St Winefride, Holywell - served by the Vocationist Fathers
 The Sacred Heart, Hawarden - served from Holywell
 St David, Mold
 St David, Pantasaph - served by the Capuchins
 St Anthony of Padua, Saltney

Gallery

References

External links
 Diocese of Wrexham site
 Blessed Sacrament Parish site
 Church of The Immaculate Conception site
 St David's Church Mold site
 St David's Church Pantasaph site
 St Anthony of Padua Parish site

Roman Catholic Deaneries in the Diocese of Wrexham